Malyam is a small village, Kanekal Mandal, Anantapur District in Andhra Pradesh, India.

References 

Villages in Anantapur district